Misch Crag is a rock crag  northeast of Forsythe Bluff, rising to about  on the west side of the Daniels Range, in the Usarp Mountains of Antarctica. It was mapped by the United States Geological Survey from surveys and U.S. Navy aerial photographs, 1960–63, and named by the Advisory Committee on Antarctic Names in 1986 after Peter Misch, Professor Emeritus of Geology, University of Washington, who has contributed to the training of numerous geologists who worked in the Antarctic.

References

External links

Cliffs of Oates Land